Francis Bouygues (5 December 192225 July 1993) was a French businessman and film producer. He founded the industrial company Bouygues in 1952 and ran  it until 1989, when his son Martin Bouygues succeeded him.

Biography

Early life
Francis Bouygues was born on December 5, 1922, in Auvergne. He graduated with an engineer's degree from École Centrale Paris in 1946.

Career
In 1952, at the age of 29, he founded Entreprise Francis Bouygues, an industrial works and building company. In 1959, he founded Stim, a property development subsidiary of Entreprise Francis Bouygues.

In 1990, he founded Ciby 2000, a film production company with his son Martin Bouygues. They produced many films including The Piano.

He died aged 70 of a heart attack on July 25, 1993, in Saint-Malo, Brittany.

Personal life
He was married to Monique Tézé and they had four children: Corinne (1947), Nicolas (1949), Olivier (1950), Martin (1952). He had lung cancer in 1976, but survived.

References

1922 births
1993 deaths
Collège Stanislas de Paris alumni
École Centrale Paris alumni
French civil engineers
Francis
Businesspeople from Paris
French television executives
Burials at Passy Cemetery